Gulnara Gabelia is a Georgian football striker currently playing in the Kazakhstani Championship for BIIK Kazygurt. She previously for in her country for Norchi Dinamoeli, with which she made her Champions League debut in July 2009. She is a member of the Georgian national team.

References

1985 births
Living people
BIIK Kazygurt players
Women's footballers from Georgia (country)
Expatriate women's footballers from Georgia (country)
Georgia (country) women's international footballers
Expatriate women's footballers in Kazakhstan
Expatriate sportspeople from Georgia (country) in Kazakhstan
Women's association football forwards